The Ridge Meadows Frizz are a Minor League ice hockey team out of Ridge Meadows, British Columbia, Canada.

Ice hockey teams in British Columbia